Zady is a village in Ukraine in Drohobych Raion, Lviv Oblast. It belongs to Medenychi rural hromada, one of the hromadas of Ukraine.

References

Villages in Drohobych Raion